Putt-Putt Joins the Circus is a video game and the sixth of adventure game of the Putt-Putt series of games. It was developed and published by Humongous Entertainment in 2000. This is the last of three games to feature Nancy Cartwright as the voice of Putt-Putt.

Plot
The game begins with Putt-Putt and Pep travelling to Apple Valley to see B.J. Sweeney's Big Top Circus. They find that a goat is blocking the road to Apple Valley, as well as the train tracks, where Roll-Along Cassidy, the circus train, is trying to deliver sawdust to the circus. Putt-Putt is able to coax the goat off of the train tracks with a flower bush. As Putt-Putt and Cassidy chat, the goat eats Putt-Putt's ticket, leaving Putt-Putt and Pep with seemingly no way to go to the circus. Cassidy, however, decides to give Putt-Putt a ride to the circus to see if B.J. Sweeney can work out a way for Putt-Putt to see the circus without a ticket.

Putt-Putt and Pep arrive early at the circus with the help of Cassidy and meet B.J., who is crying over the fact that all five of his main acts are having problems. He shows Putt-Putt a piece of paper, showing the performers of the five main acts: Honko the Clown, The Flying Porkowskis, Phillipe the Flea, Reginald the Lion and Katie Cannonball. Putt-Putt introduces himself and volunteers to get the five main acts working again.

After giving Honko his clown nose, giving the Flying Porkowskis their safety net, finding a nice umbrella as a tent for Phillipe and his Flea Troup to perform, giving Reginald the Lion his proper costume and helping Katie Cannonball set up her cannon, the circus gets all set to open. As a reward for saving the circus, B.J. Sweeney lets Putt-Putt perform. At the end, Putt-Putt presses the button that opens a curtain, and all the five main acts perform their tricks. Honko then splats a pie on the screen, ending the game.

Gameplay
The game uses the same mechanics as its predecessors including Putt-Putt's dashboard interface and some minigames included. Throughout the game the player must solve characters' problems and unite all five circus actors.

Development
All backgrounds, characters and animations were hand drawn.

Reception

Critical reception

The game was well received and earned a number of awards around its year of release.

Commercial performance
Between May 11 and 13, the game had debuted at the Electronic Entertainment Expo (E3) 2000 in Los Angeles.

During the year 2001 alone, Putt-Putt Joins the Circus sold 82,400 retail units in North America, according to PC Data.

References

External links
 
 Putt-Putt Joins the Circus at Humongous Entertainment

Putt-Putt Joins the Circus
Humongous Entertainment games
Infogrames games
Adventure games
IOS games
Linux games
Classic Mac OS games
ScummVM-supported games
Windows games
Point-and-click adventure games
Video games developed in the United States
Single-player video games
Children's educational video games
Tommo games